Meteorological Service Singapore (MSS) mission is to observe and understand the weather and climate affecting Singapore and to provide services in support of national needs and international co-operation. It collects and maintain reliable long-term national weather records, provides reliable weather and climate services. It also 
conducts research to advance understanding and prediction of the weather and climate of Singapore and the region. It does risk and impact assessment of natural environmental hazards.

It is a division of the National Environment Agency, Singapore.

History   
The following timeline represents major developments of MSS.
 2013: MSS entered a new phase of R&D with the launch of The Centre for Climate Research Singapore (CCRS)
 2002: MSS became part of the National Environment Agency under the Ministry of the Environment and Water Resources
 1993: The ASEAN Specialised Meteorological Centre (ASMC), hosted by MSS, was launched.
 1981: When Changi Airport opened in 1981, the Forecast Office was relocated there followed by the MSS headquarters in 1983
 1972: MSS began receiving real-time data from meteorological satellites in space
 1969: Meteorological Service Singapore (MSS) was established as a Department of the newly set up Ministry of Communications
 1966: Singapore joined the World Meteorological Organisation (WMO), a specialised agency of the United Nations
 1965: When Singapore achieved independence, the Meteorological Service in Singapore came under the then Deputy Prime Minister’s Office
 1953: The Upper Air Observatory was established to make upper air observations using balloon-borne radiosondes
 1948: The first weather radar in Singapore, able to detect rain clouds up to 240 km away, was installed at Kallang Airport
 1937: A full scale meteorological service was established with the setting up of a Forecast Office at Kallang Airport
 1931: Headquarters of the Malayan Meteorological Service was transferred from Kuala Lumpur to Singapore
 1930: The Meteorological Branch was constituted as the Malayan Meteorological Service, serving British Malaya including Singapore
 1929: First full-scale meteorological station was set up at Mount Faber. Start of Singapore’s temperature records.
 1927: A Meteorological Branch was formally established within the Malayan Survey Department
 1869: Start of Singapore’s rainfall records.

Department
The key departments within MSS are:
 Centre for Climate Research Singapore (CCRS). CCRS does tropical climate and weather research focusing on the Southeast Asia region. 
 Meteorological Systems Department (MSD). MSD provides support for meteorological equipment, computer systems and key installations in order to meet MSS's operational and technical requirements.
 Risk and Resource Department (RRD). RRD analyses risks and assesses their impact from the corporate/organisational angle as well as those pertaining to environmental /natural hazards.
 Weather Services Department (WSD). WSD provides weather forecasts, warnings, monitoring and assessment. It provides such information to critical sectors like the civil aviation, military, maritime, private/public agencies and the general public.

References

External links

 

Governmental meteorological agencies in Asia
1965 establishments in Singapore
Government agencies established in 1965